Sture Mårtensson (27 April 1916 – 15 February 2004) was a Swedish footballer who played his entire professional career at Malmö FF as a defender.

References

External links

1916 births
2004 deaths
Association football defenders
Swedish footballers
Allsvenskan players
Malmö FF players
Sweden international footballers
Footballers from Malmö